West Virginia's 9th Senate district is one of 17 districts in the West Virginia Senate. It is currently represented by Republicans Rollan Roberts and David Stover. All districts in the West Virginia Senate elect two members to staggered four-year terms.

Geography
District 9 is based in Raleigh and Wyoming Counties in Southern West Virginia, also covering a small portion of northern McDowell County. Communities in the district include Beckley, Mabscott, Sophia, Beaver, Bradley, Coal City, Crab Orchard, Daniels, MacArthur, Prosperity, Shady Spring, Stanaford, Mullens, and Oceana.

The district is located entirely within West Virginia's 3rd congressional district, and overlaps with the 21st, 24th, 25th, 26th, 27th, 28th, 29th, 30th, 31st, and 32nd districts of the West Virginia House of Delegates.

Recent election results

2022

Historical election results

2020

2018

2016

2014

2012

Federal and statewide results in District 9

References

9
McDowell County, West Virginia
Raleigh County, West Virginia
Wyoming County, West Virginia